Abdusalom Abdullayev (Tajik: Абдусалом Абдуллоев, 15 December 1951 Kanibadam, Tajikistan) is a Tajikistani artist and cinematographer. From 1976 to 1992, he worked as an art director and production designer of the “Tajikfilm” studio, working on over 20 films.

References

External links 
 
 ArtBeak Profile

Tajikistani cinematographers
1951 births
Living people
Tajikistani costume designers